The decennial Census of India has been conducted 16 times, as of 2021. While it has been undertaken every 10 years, beginning in 1872 under British Viceroy Lord Mayo, the first complete census was taken in 1881. Post 1949, it has been conducted by the Registrar General and Census Commissioner of India under the Ministry of Home Affairs, Government of India. All the censuses since 1951 were conducted under the 1948 Census of India Act , which predates the Constitution of India. The 1948 Census of India Act does not bind the Union Government to conduct the Census on a particular date or to release its data in a notified period. The last  census was held in 2011, whilst the next was to be held in 2021. But it has been postponed due to the COVID-19 pandemic in India.

Historically, there has been a long time between collection of data and dissemination of data. The taking of Census was a regular process in the Mauryan administration. The village officials (Gramika) and municipal officials (Nagarika) were responsible for enumerating different classes of people in the Mauryan empire such as traders, agriculturists, smiths, potters, carpenters etc., and also cattle, mostly for taxation purposes. These vocations consolidated as castes, a feature of Indian society that continues to influence the Indian politics till today.

Census of India during British Rule 

List of censuses conducted in India before independence:
1872 Census of India
1881 Census of India
1891 Census of India
1901 Census of India
1911 Census of India
1921 Census of India
1931 Census of India
1941 Census of India

Census of Republic of India 
List of censuses conducted in India after independence:
1951 Census of India
1961 Census of India
1971 Census of India 
1981 Census of India
1991 Census of India
2001 Census of India
2011 Census of India
2021 Census of India

See also
Demographics of India
List of states and union territories of India by population
List of cities in India by population
List of towns in India by population
List of million-plus urban agglomerations in India
List of states in India by past population
List of states and union territories of India by sex ratio
List of Indian states and union territories by literacy rate

References 
 Stamps issued by India Post

External links 
 

Demographics of India